Liga Bolasepak Rakyat was the fourth-tier football league in Malaysia. The league was managed by Liga Bolasepak Rakyat-Limited Liability Partnership (LBR-LLP) and it was an amateur-level competition. It was established in 2015 to provide an alternative entry point for young players. The league has discontinued since 2017 and have been replaced by M4 League.

The last champion was Gua Musang, a club from East Zone which won the league in 2016–17 season.

History 
Liga Bolasepak Rakyat is a joint idea of Football Association of Malaysia (FAM) president Tengku Abdullah Sultan Ahmad Shah and Tengku Mahkota Pahang, with an objective of developing football systematically, besides functioning as an institute to produce talented players for the national side. A total of 111 clubs from all around the country will be joining the amateur-level competition for 2015–16 season, which is divided to 8 zones where 520 matches to be played. The competition is open to under-28 players, including five under-21 boys.

After a successful early stage of the league during its first season, FAM has approved to give out the right of the league management to LBR-LLP for ten years in order to develop lower league football.

The second season of LBR will start in September 2016 with 125 clubs planned to be competing in the league. On 25 September 2016, it has been confirmed that a total of 108 clubs participated in the league to represent their district in the league for the second season even though ten Johor based clubs pulled from the league. LBR-LLP has also announced that a women's league for LBR will commence next year as part of LBR effort to support women's football development in Malaysia. LBR-LLP also has launched the kits with themes inspired by common region colour according to the zones the clubs participated. The purpose for effort are to fulfil sponsors obligation and to promote the branding for the league and also help clubs to reduce management cost. Even though a common kits has been introduced, clubs are still allowed to use their own kits instead of it.

Clubs 

Currently there are a total of 108 clubs out of more than 150 possible districts in the country participated in the Liga Bolasepak Rakyat for 2016–17 season. The clubs were divided into 8 zones according to regional location.

Years 
 2015–present: as a fourth-tier league competition.

Champions

Performance by club (2015–present)

Performance by states (2015–present)

Notes

References

External links
 
 

 
4
Mal